Poljice may refer to several places:

Bosnia and Herzegovina 
Poljice, Drvar, village in the Drvar municipality
Poljice, Foča, village in the Foča municipality
Poljice, Kakanj, village in the Kakanj municipality
Poljice, Lukavac, village in the Lukavac municipality
Poljice, Maglaj, village in the Maglaj municipality
Poljice Čičevo, village in the Trebinje municipality
Poljice Popovo, village in the Trebinje municipality

Croatia 
Poljice, Dubrovnik-Neretva County, village in the Konavle municipality
Poljice, Lika-Senj County, village in the Udbina municipality

See also
Poljica (disambiguation)